During the later years of Dutch colonial rule on the Gold Coast, the Dutch operated a government school (Dutch: gouvernementsschool) in Elmina Castle, primarily aimed at educating Euro-African boys in Elmina. After many false starts, regular education started in the early 1850s with about 50 pupils, rising to more than 150 in the 1860s.

History 
The Portuguese started a school in Elmina Castle as early as 1529. For a while after the Dutch had taken Elmina from the Portuguese in 1637, they also operated a school, but teaching soon came to a halt and was not reestablished until the early 19th century. In 1815, two teachers accompanied governor Herman Willem Daendels to the Gold Coast, but they were let go as part of the reorganisation of the colony after Daendels' death in 1818. In 1837, another teacher was sent to the Gold Coast, but he perished soon after arrival during the military campaign against the Ahanta organised by governor Hendrik Tonneboeijer.

Continuous education at the government school started when Melchior Eland took office as headmaster on 11 December 1847. Although he died in office in October 1848, the vacancy of headmaster was immediately filled by Hendrikus Jeltes Tadema, who took office a year later. Tadema had a troubled relationship with the colonial administrators and left the Gold Coast in December 1852.

Tadema's replacement Dirk Demmers, who took office on 11 March 1853, would be headmaster for more than fifteen years. Under Demmers' headmastership, enrolment in the government school greatly expanded, rising from 60 pupils in 1853 to 168 in 1862. To accommodate the increased workload, the first local substitute teacher was appointed in 1857. In 1859, a sewing and knitting school for girls was started by Hiltje Winsemius, spouse of the pastor of Elmina.

Demmers was honourably discharged from his headmastership on 8 May 1868. He was replaced by Arie Hendrik Smits, who had been working as a substitute teacher in Elmina since February 1861. Pieter Simon Hamel was appointed to the vacancy left by Smits' promotion. Hamel would take over as headmaster upon Smits' death on 7 January 1871.

The government school in Elmina was closed after the transfer of sovereignty of the Dutch possessions on the Gold Coast to the United Kingdom on 6 April 1872.

Staff

Headmasters

Substitute teachers 
 Gerrit Atteveld
 Hendrik Vroom
 Emanuel José (da Costa)
 Kobbena Jacobs
 Joseph Kwakoe

Notable alumni 
 Cornelius Badu, member of the 
 George Emil Eminsang
 Willem Essuman Pietersen
 Hendrik Vroom

Notes

References 
 
 
 
 

Dutch Gold Coast